Quebrada La Guairita is a small river that collects the waters of the streams from the areas of Baruta, La Trinidad, El Hatillo and El Cafetal in Venezuela, originating in the place known as Ojo de Agua in southern Baruta at an approximate height of .

References

Baruta Municipality
El Hatillo Municipality
Rivers of Capital District (Venezuela)
Rivers of Miranda (state)